Francisco Rodríguez de Valcárcel (23 May 1590 – 18 Jun 1651) was a Roman Catholic prelate who served as Bishop of Cartagena (1649–1651).

Biography
Francisco Rodríguez de Valcárcel was born on 23 May 1590 in Zamora, Spain.
On 28 Jun 1649, he was appointed during the papacy of Pope Innocent X as Bishop of Cartagena.
On 4 Sep 1650, he was consecrated bishop by Juan de Espinoza y Orozco, Bishop of Santa Marta.
He served as Bishop of Cartagena until his death on 18 Jun 1651.

References

External links and additional sources
 (for Chronology of Bishops) 
 (for Chronology of Bishops) 

17th-century Roman Catholic bishops in New Granada
Bishops appointed by Pope Innocent X
Roman Catholic bishops of Cartagena in Colombia
1590 births
1651 deaths
People from Zamora, Spain